San Ildefonso Villa Alta is a town and municipality in Oaxaca in south-western Mexico. The municipality covers an area of 136.52 km². 
It is part of the Villa Alta District in the center of the Sierra Norte Region.

As of 2005, the municipality had a total population of 3100.

References

Municipalities of Oaxaca